Samuel Weideman (born 26 June 1997) is a professional Australian rules footballer playing for the Essendon Football Club in the Australian Football League (AFL). He played top-level football early, playing in the TAC Cup as a bottom-aged player. His achievements as a junior included two best and fairest awards and national representation. Even though an ankle injury forced him to miss the majority of his final year of junior football, he was drafted by Melbourne with the ninth selection in the 2015 AFL draft. He made his AFL debut in 2016, making him a third-generation footballer, whereby he is the grandson of the Collingwood Football Club's 1958 premiership captain, Murray Weideman, and the son of former Collingwood player, Mark Weideman.

Early life

Weideman was born into an Australian rules football family with his grandfather, Murray Weideman, playing 180 matches for the Collingwood Football Club, including winning two premierships (he captained the 1958 premiership), winning three Copeland Trophies as Collingwood's best and fairest, and is a member of the Australian Football Hall of Fame; his father, Mark Weideman, also played for Collingwood, playing 28 games. Although both his father and grandfather played for Collingwood, he grew up a passionate supporter of the Richmond Football Club. He attended Whitefriars College, graduating year twelve in 2015, and he played his junior football with the Vermont Football Club in the Eastern Football League where he won back-to-back best and fairests after switching from a ruckman to a forward at 16 years of age. He played with the Eastern Ranges in the TAC Cup as a bottom-aged player in 2014, and despite an iron deficiency and an ankle stress fracture hampering his second half of the season, he played fifteen matches and kicked nineteen goals. He received a scholarship within the prestigious AFL Academy for 2015, which included playing in the curtain raiser for the 2014 AFL Grand Final with the under-17 Australian team.

Returning to the Eastern Ranges in 2015, Weideman played five matches, kicking nine goals, including five goals in one match against the Dandenong Stingrays. He received mid-year honours through selection with Vic Metro for the 2015 AFL Under 18 Championships, and he was named vice-captain, however a re-aggravation of his ankle injury saw him ruled out for the entire championships and the remainder of the TAC Cup season. After playing no football since May, doubts surrounded Weideman and his injuries, however Eastern Ranges talent manager, Len Villani, noted "his qualities made him a rare commodity", and the AFL Academy coach, Brad Johnson, stated "every now and then you’ll see things from him and you know with good development into the future, he’s going to turn into a really strong, consistent performer" and "the right people have seen enough already through his junior days to say he’ll be able to get back to some pretty strong fitness, work on his endurance and become a really good hit-up forward". Along with comparisons to  forward, Matthew Pavlich, and  forward, Tom Lynch, he was predicted to still be drafted inside the top ten in the 2015 national draft.

AFL career
After being linked to the Melbourne Football Club in the weeks leading to the 2015 national draft, Weideman was drafted by them with their second selection and ninth overall. The match against Coburg was labelled his best for the year by Casey coach, Justin Plapp, and after kicking twenty goals from eleven matches, he made his AFL debut the next week in the twenty-nine point win against the Hawthorn Football Club at the Melbourne Cricket Ground in round 20. His debut match was praised within the AFL industry for him "having an immediate impact" and he was labelled as "impressive", where he kicked a goal with his first kick and amassed six disposals in the first quarter, finishing with two goals and thirteen disposals. During his debut match, he suffered a corked thigh which meant he missed the forty point win against  at the Adelaide Oval the next week. He returned in round 22 for the twenty point loss against  at the Melbourne Cricket Ground and he played the remaining match of the season to finish with three matches and three goals for the season.

Following the conclusion of the 2022 AFL season, Weideman was traded to Essendon in search of more opportunities as a key forward.

Statistics
Updated to the end of the 2022 season.

|-
| 2016 ||  || 26
| 3 || 3 || 0 || 8 || 17 || 25 || 9 || 0 || 1.0 || 0.0 || 2.7 || 5.7 || 8.4 || 3.0 || 0.0
|-
| 2017 ||  || 26
| 7 || 3 || 4 || 24 || 32 || 56 || 18 || 12 || 0.3 || 0.6 || 3.4 || 4.6 || 8.0 || 2.6 || 1.7
|-
| 2018 ||  || 26
| 10 || 10 || 5 || 57 || 58 || 115 || 40 || 24 || 1.0 || 0.5 || 5.7 || 5.8 || 11.5 || 4.0 || 2.4
|-
| 2019 ||  || 26
| 11 || 11 || 8 || 60 || 53 || 113 || 46 || 16 || 1.0 || 0.7 || 5.5 || 4.8 || 10.3 || 4.2 || 1.5
|-
| 2020 ||  || 26
| 13 || 19 || 8 || 59 || 41 || 100 || 41 || 6 || 1.5 || 0.6 || 4.5 || 3.2 || 7.7 || 3.2 || 0.5
|-
| 2021 ||  || 26
| 5 || 3 || 4 || 19 || 21 || 40 || 16 || 9 || 0.6 || 0.8 || 3.8 || 4.2 || 8.0 || 3.2 || 1.8
|-
| 2022 ||  || 26
| 10 || 13 || 6 || 46 || 37 || 83 || 28 || 14 || 1.3 || 0.6 || 4.6 || 3.7 || 8.3 || 2.8 || 1.4
|- class=sortbottom
! colspan=3 | Career
! 59 !! 62 !! 35 !! 273 !! 259 !! 532 !! 198 !! 81 !! 1.1 !! 0.6 !! 4.6 !! 4.4 !! 9.0 !! 3.4 !! 1.4
|}

Notes

References

External links

1997 births
Living people
Melbourne Football Club players
Casey Demons players
Eastern Ranges players
Australian rules footballers from Victoria (Australia)